Witney is a county constituency in Oxfordshire represented in the House of Commons of the Parliament of the United Kingdom. It elects one Member of Parliament by the first-past-the-post system of election, and was created for the 1983 general election. It has been a safe Conservative Party seat at recent elections. It is currently represented by Robert Courts of the Conservative Party.

It was represented from 2001 to 2016 by David Cameron, Leader of the Conservative Party (2005–2016) and UK Prime Minister (2010–2016). On 12 September 2016, Cameron resigned from serving as an MP triggering the 2016 Witney by-election, at which Robert Courts of the Conservatives retained the seat; albeit with a reduced majority. His vote share subsequently rose to 55% at the 2017 and 2019 general elections.

It is coterminous with the district of West Oxfordshire, and includes the towns of Carterton, Chipping Norton and Woodstock.

History 
In the late 19th century, the Bampton East petty sessional division, with Witney at its heart, formed one part of the Woodstock constituency.

Until 1974, much of the seat remained as part of the Woodstock and latterly Banbury constituency. From 1974 to 1983, the area was included in the Mid Oxfordshire seat along with parts of Bullingdon and Ploughley.  Since 1983, Witney has been a full parliamentary seat in its own right and comprises the whole of the District of West Oxfordshire with surrounding villages attached until 1997.

Carterton is the second largest populated town with 14,000 and is situated alongside RAF Brize Norton which is vital to the local economy, being one of the largest and busiest Royal Air Force stations in the country.

The constituency's first MP was Douglas Hurd, who served as a cabinet minister under both Margaret Thatcher and John Major, and retired in 1997.  Hurd was succeeded by Shaun Woodward at the 1997 general election.  However, Woodward defected to the Labour Party in 1999, and Witney unexpectedly had a Labour MP.  Woodward chose not to stand in Witney as a Labour candidate and moved to the Labour safe seat of St Helens South instead, following the practice of Alan Howarth in 1997.

At the 2001 general election, David Cameron was elected as MP for Witney.  Cameron was re-elected to a fourth term as MP for the constituency at the 2015 general election with a majority of 25,155, the highest in his political career; on that occasion his Conservative Party won a surprise overall majority in the House of Commons, taking 330 seats to the opposition Labour Party's 232. However, on 24 June 2016, Cameron announced that he would resign as Prime Minister by that October due to the outcome of the EU Referendum the previous day, in which 51.9% of voters supported leaving the EU. Ultimately, Cameron stepped down as premier that July, on the election of Theresa May as Conservative Party leader and Prime Minister. On 12 September 2016, it was announced that Cameron would resign as MP for Witney. This triggered a by-election, which was won by Robert Courts, also a Conservative, albeit with a significantly reduced majority.

Before the 2019 general election, the Liberal Democrats and Green Party agreed not to run against each other as part of a "Unite to Remain" alliance. This led to Andrew Prosser, who had been selected as the Green Party's prospective candidate  standing down.

Boundaries and boundary changes 

1983–1997: The District of West Oxfordshire wards of Ascott and Shipton, Aston Bampton and Standlake, Bampton, Bladon and Cassington, Brize Norton and Curbridge, Burford, Carterton North, Carterton South, Chadlington, Charlbury, Chipping Norton, Clanfield and Shilton, Combe and Stonesfield, Ducklington, Enstone, Eynsham, Filkins and Langford, Finstock and Leafield, Freeland and Hanborough, Hailey, Kingham, Milton-under-Wychwood, Minster Lovell, North Leigh, Rollright, Stanton Harcourt, Witney East, Witney North, Witney South, Witney West, and Woodstock, and the District of Cherwell wards of Gosford, North West Kidlington, South East Kidlington, and Yarnton.

The new constituency was largely formed from the majority of the abolished County Constituency of Mid-Oxon, including the settlements of Witney, Carterton, Woodstock and Kidlington. Chipping Norton and surrounding rural areas were transferred from the Banbury constituency.

1997–2010: The District of West Oxfordshire, and the District of Cherwell ward of Yarnton.

The remaining two wards of the District of West Oxfordshire (Bartons, and Tackley and Wooton) were transferred from Banbury.  Kidlington transferred to Oxford West and Abingdon.

2010–present: The District of West Oxfordshire.

As part of the Fifth Periodic Review of Westminster constituencies the Boundary Commission reported in 2004 that the seat of Witney could be composed from the entire district of West Oxfordshire, with the District of Cherwell ward of Yarnton being transferred to Oxford West and Abingdon.

Members of Parliament

Elections

Elections in the 2020s

Elections in the 2010s

:

Elections in the 2000s
:

:

Elections in the 1990s

Elections in the 1980s

Neighbouring constituencies

See also 
 List of parliamentary constituencies in Oxfordshire
 Henley (UK Parliament constituency)
 Oxford East (UK Parliament constituency)
 Oxford West and Abingdon (UK Parliament constituency)
 Wantage (UK Parliament constituency)

References 

Parliamentary constituencies in Oxfordshire
Constituencies of the Parliament of the United Kingdom established in 1983
Constituencies of the Parliament of the United Kingdom represented by a sitting Prime Minister
David Cameron
West Oxfordshire District